Trevor Rees Clark (9 November 1916 – 5 April 1984) was a New Zealand weightlifter who represented his country at the 1950 British Empire Games and 1954 British Empire and Commonwealth Games.

Clark won eight New Zealand national weightlifting titles: four in the light heavyweight division, in consecutive years from 1947 to 1950; three in the middle heavyweight division, in 1951, 1952, and 1953; and the middleweight division in 1939.

During World War II, Clark served as a private in the 2nd New Zealand Expeditionary Force, and was taken prisoner of war in Crete in 1941. He was held in Stalag VIII-B, later renumbered Stalag-344.

Clark was the manager of the New Zealand weightlifting team at the 1964 Summer Olympics in Tokyo.

Clark died in Auckland on 5 April 1984.

References

1916 births
1984 deaths
Sportspeople from Auckland
New Zealand military personnel of World War II
New Zealand prisoners of war in World War II
Weightlifters at the 1950 British Empire Games
Weightlifters at the 1954 British Empire and Commonwealth Games
New Zealand male weightlifters
World War II prisoners of war held by Germany
Commonwealth Games competitors for New Zealand
20th-century New Zealand people